Mark Withers may refer to:

Mark Withers (actor) (born 1947), American television actor
Mark Withers (footballer) (born 1964), Australian rules footballer